The Marietta City School District is a public school district that serves students in grades K-12 who live in and around Marietta, a city in Washington County, Ohio, United States. The district has four elementary schools (Harmar, Phillips, Putnam, and Washington), one middle school (Marietta Middle School), and one high school (Marietta High School), and serves the communities of Marietta, Reno, Devola, Harmar, and Oak Grove.

References

Marietta, Ohio
School districts in Ohio
Education in Washington County, Ohio